Greis Domi (born 30 October 1998) is an Albanian footballer who plays as a midfielder for Cittadella Women and has appeared for the Albania women's national team.

Career
Domi has been capped for the Albania national team, appearing for the team during the 2019 FIFA Women's World Cup qualifying cycle.

See also
List of Albania women's international footballers

References

External links
 
 
 

1998 births
Living people
Albanian women's footballers
Albania women's international footballers
Women's association football midfielders
Expatriate women's footballers in Italy
Albanian expatriate sportspeople in Italy
Serie A (women's football) players
Fiorentina Women's F.C. players
Torres Calcio Femminile players
Pomigliano C.F. players
Roma Calcio Femminile players
Albanian expatriate footballers
ACF Firenze players